Brandon is a city in and the county seat of Rankin County, Mississippi, United States. It was incorporated on December 19, 1831. The population was 21,705 at the 2010 census. Brandon is part of the Jackson Metropolitan Statistical Area, and is located east of the state capital.

History
The city is named for Gerard Brandon, Governor of Mississippi during the early 1800s.  A newspaper, The News, was established in 1892.  The Brandon Bank was established in 1900, and The Rankin County Bank was established in 1906.  In 1900, Brandon had a school, a telephone and telegraph office, a saw mill, two livery stables, two cotton gins, two hotels, six churches, and fifteen or twenty stores.  The population was 775.

Geography
According to the United States Census Bureau, the city has a total area of 21.3 square miles (55.3 km), of which 21.3 square miles (55.1 km) is land and 0.1 square mile (0.2 km) (0.37%) is water.

Demographics

2020 census

As of the 2020 United States census, there were 25,138 people, 8,780 households, and 6,593 families residing in the city.

2000 census
As of the census of 2000, there were 16,436 people, 6,295 households, and 4,595 families residing in the city. The population density was 773.2 people per square mile (298.5/km). There were 6,540 housing units at an average density of 307.7 per square mile (118.8/km). The racial makeup of the city was 86.61% White, 11.89% Black, 0.10% Native American, 0.58% Asian, 0.06% Pacific Islander, 0.30% from other races, and 0.47% from two or more races. Hispanic or Latino people of any race were 1.30% of the population.

There were 6,295 households, out of which 36.0% had children under the age of 18 living with them, 59.0% were married couples living together, 11.4% had a female householder with no husband present, and 27.0% were non-families. 23.4% of all households were made up of individuals, and 7.4% had someone living alone who was 65 years of age or older. The average household size was 2.53 and the average family size was 3.00.

In the city, the population was spread out, with 25.2% under the age of 18, 8.3% from 18 to 24, 30.4% from 25 to 44, 24.5% from 45 to 64, and 11.5% who were 65 years of age or older. The median age was 36 years. For every 100 females, there were 90.1 males. For every 100 females age 18 and over, there were 86.0 males.

The median income for a household in the city was $53,246, and the median income for a family was $63,098. Males had a median income of $42,414 versus $28,128 for females. The per capita income for the city was $24,020. About 4.1% of families and 6.0% of the population were below the poverty line, including 7.7% of those under age 18 and 10.7% of those age 65 or over.

Economy
The Mississippi Department of Corrections operates the Brandon Probation & Parole Office in Brandon. The Central Mississippi Correctional Facility, located in unincorporated Rankin County, is in proximity to Brandon.

Arts and culture
The Downtown Brandon Historic District is located within the city.  Brandon is the location of the Black Rose Theatre Company.

Buildings on the National Register of Historic Places, including:
 Cocke-Martin-Jackson House
 Hebron Academy
 Rankin County Courthouse
 Stevens-Buchanan House
 Turcotte House

Government
The city of Brandon has a city mayor as the chief executive officer and a board of aldermen, with six elected from single-member districts and one elected at-large. The current city officials are Mayor Butch Lee; Alderman, At-Large member Sharon Womack; Alderman, Ward 1 Jarrad Craine; Alderman, Ward 2 Cris Vinson; Alderman, Ward 3 Harry Williams; Alderman, Ward 4 Lu Coker; Alderman, Ward 5 Dwight Middleton; and Alderman, Ward 6 David Farris. The city's attorney is Mark C. Baker.

Education
The City of Brandon is served by the Rankin County School District.

Public schools
 Brandon High School (grades 9-12)
 Brandon Middle School (grades 6-8)
 Brandon Elementary School (grades 4-5)
 Stonebridge Elementary School (grades 2-3)
 Rouse Elementary School (grades K-1)

Infrastructure
The city of Brandon is served by five fire stations and one administrative central station under the direction of Fire Chief Terry Wages. In 2015, the city established an independent EMS district that provides ambulance services through a private provider, Pafford EMS. The city has one police station under the direction of Police Chief Wayne Dearman.

Notable people 
 Devin Britton, professional tennis player
 J. W. Buchanan, Arizona State Senator
 Demario Davis, professional football player
 Jenna Edwards, former Miss Florida and Miss Florida USA
 Aiden Flowers, actor
Patrick Henry, (1843–1930), U.S. representative
 Volney Howard, Attorney General and U.S. Representative for Texas
 Skylar Laine, country singer; placed fifth on the eleventh season of American Idol
 Mamie Locke, political scientist, Virginia state senator
 Justin Mapp, professional soccer player
 Anselm Joseph McLaurin, Governor of Mississippi 1896–1900
 John C. McLaurin, mayor of Brandon and state senator
 Gardner Minshew, Quarterback for the Philadelphia Eagles
 Mary Ann Mobley, American actress, television personality, and first Miss America from Mississippi
 Tyler Moore, professional baseball player for the Washington Nationals
 Jerious Norwood, professional football player
 Jonathan Randolph, professional golfer
 Sarah Thomas, first female NFL official
 Joe M. Turner, professional magician, mentalist, speaker
 Louis H. Wilson, Jr., 26th Commandant of the Marine Corps and member of the Joint Chiefs of Staff, recipient of The Medal of Honor

References

External links

 
Cities in Mississippi
Cities in Rankin County, Mississippi
County seats in Mississippi
Cities in Jackson metropolitan area, Mississippi
1831 establishments in Mississippi
Populated places established in 1831